Bayasade Banda Bhagya (Kannada: ಬಯಸದೇ ಬಂದ ಭಾಗ್ಯ)is a 1977 Kannada film written by Bala Murugan and directed by R. Ramamurthy. The film stars Vishnuvardhan and Balakrishna, with actors Manjula, Ram Gopal, and Sri Lalitha.

Plot

Cast
 Vishnuvardhan
 Manjula
 Ram Gopal
 Sri Lalitha
 T. N. Balakrishna
 Shivaram

Soundtrack
"Muttina Hanigalu" - R. N. Jayagopal - Rajan Nagendra - S. Janaki S. P. Balasubrahmanyam

"Preethisu Sameepisu" - Chi. Udayashankar - S. Janaki  P. B. Sreenivas

References

External links
 Bayasade Banda Bhagya at the Internet Movie Database

1977 films
1970s Kannada-language films
Films scored by Rajan–Nagendra
Films directed by R. Ramamurthy